The John Harrington Stevens House is a historic structure in the U.S. state of Minnesota. Named for John H. Stevens, it was the first authorized house on the west bank of the Mississippi River in what would become Minneapolis. The house is the second oldest remaining wood frame house in Minneapolis (the Ard Godfrey house is older). The house is part of the Minnehaha Historic District and managed by the Minneapolis Park and Recreation Board. The structure was heavily damaged by three acts of arson in 2022.

History

"Birthplace of Minneapolis" 
The house was built in 1850 at Saint Anthony Falls by John H. Stevens on the site where the Minneapolis Post Office now sits. He was granted permission to build his house on land controlled by Fort Snelling in exchange for providing ferry service across the river, accounting for the nickname "ferry farm." In the subsequent five years, the home became a hub of civic and social activity, and was dubbed the "birthplace of Minneapolis." Both Hennepin County and Minneapolis were organized in Stevens' home. He and his wife, Frances Helen, had no white neighbors, but Native people were often seen nearby.

Preservation 
The Stevens House was moved several times, finally to Minnehaha Park in south Minneapolis in 1896. The home is part of the Minnehaha Historic District, which was listed on the National Register of Historic Places in 1969. The house was a museum, with tours available on summer weekends.

The house was placed ender the jurisdiction of the Minneapolis Park and Recreation Board. In 2022, the Star Tribune reported on its deteriorating condition with repairs tentatively planned for the future.

Arson 
The house was damaged by three arson attacks in 2022. A fire on August 30 heavily damaged the building's back side, but preservationists determined it could be rebuilt. A fire on September 20 affected part of the exterior. Initial work on the renovation was underway when another suspicious fire on October 1 burned the first and second floors and part of the roof.

Gallery

References

External links
John H. Stevens House

Historic district contributing properties in Minnesota
Historic house museums in Minnesota
Houses in Minneapolis
Houses on the National Register of Historic Places in Minnesota
National Register of Historic Places in Mississippi National River and Recreation Area
Museums in Minneapolis
National Register of Historic Places in Minneapolis
Relocated buildings and structures in Minnesota
Arson in the 2020s